Tuomas Suominen (born January 17, 1984) is a Finnish ice hockey player. He is currently playing with HC TPS in the Finnish Liiga.

Suominen made his SM-liiga debut playing with HC TPS during the 2004–05 season.

References

External links

1984 births
Living people
Finnish ice hockey forwards
HC TPS players
Sportspeople from Turku